The Song of Eärendil is the longest poem in The Lord of the Rings. In the fiction, it is sung and composed by the Hobbit Bilbo Baggins in the Elvish sanctuary of Rivendell. It tells how the mariner Eärendil tries to sail to a place of paradise, and acquires a Silmaril, a prized sun-jewel. Eventually he and his ship are set in the heavens to sail forever as the light of the Morning Star.

The work is described by the philologist and Tolkien scholar Tom Shippey as exemplifying "an elvish streak ... signalled ... by barely-precedented intricacies" of poetry. This corresponds to the tradition of complex poetic mechanisms seen in the Middle English poem Pearl. The "Song of Eärendil" was written to contrast with another of Tolkien's poems, "Errantry", which uses the same mechanisms to quite different effect. In the narrative, the Hobbit Frodo Baggins, recently healed from a dangerous wound, listens to the poem in Keatsian style.

History of composition

The longest poem in The Lord of the Rings is the "Song of Eärendil", also called Eärendillinwë in a different version. This poem has an extraordinarily complex history. Long before writing The Lord of the Rings, Tolkien wrote a poem he called "Errantry", probably in the early 1930s, published in The Oxford Magazine on 9 November 1933.  Although this fanciful poem does not mention Eärendil, nor any names or events from his mythology, Bilbo Baggins's song ultimately derives from it. There are six texts of different versions of this poem extant in Tolkien's papers, and no less than 15 further manuscripts and typescripts of Bilbo's song, in several lines of development.  In fact, based on the evidence of the existing texts, it appears that the version which Tolkien sent to his publisher and which was published in the book was actually not his final version of the poem.  Apparently the final version was mislaid, and an earlier version was the one that was printed.

Narrative

The poem tells the story of how in the First Age of Middle-earth the mariner Eärendil, half-Man, half-Elven, tries to sail to some sort of paradise. Eventually he acquires a Silmaril, a forged sun-jewel, and he and his ship are set in the heavens to sail forever as the light of the Morning Star, as described in one of the verses:

Reception

Scholars have identified multiple functions of the poem, including that of providing some backstory.

Medieval complexity

The "Song of Eärendil" is described by Tom Shippey as exemplifying "an elvish streak .. signalled .. by barely-precedented intricacies" of poetry. He notes however that the Elvish tradition corresponded to a real English tradition, that of the Middle English poem Pearl. It makes use of an attempt at immortality and a "fantastically complex metrical scheme" with many poetic mechanisms, including alliteration as well as rhyme; for example, it begins "Perle, plesaunte to prynces paye / To clanly clos in golde so clere". Shippey observes that the tradition of such complex verse had died out before the time of Shakespeare and Milton, to their and their readers' loss, and that "Tolkien obviously hoped in one way to recreate it," just as he sought to create a substitute for the lost English mythology.

Shippey identifies five mechanisms used by Tolkien in The Song of Eärendil to convey an "elvish" feeling of "rich and continuous uncertainty, a pattern forever being glimpsed but never quite grasped", its goals "romanticism, multitudinousness, imperfect comprehension .. achieved stylistically much more than semantically." The mechanisms are rhyme, internal half-rhyme, alliteration, alliterative assonance, and "a frequent if irregular variation of syntax." They can be seen in the first stanza of the long poem, only some of the instances being highlighted:

Keatsian effect

In the narrative, the Hobbit Frodo Baggins, more or less healed after being stabbed with a Morgul-knife by a Black Rider, sits listening to the Elvish music, falling into a trancelike state, until he hears "Song of Eärendil" which his cousin Bilbo sings, and supposedly composed, at Elrond's house, Rivendell:

The Tolkien scholars Wayne G. Hammond and Christina Scull comment on this passage that the effect of the Elvish song is like that of "Faërian drama" as described by Tolkien in his essay "On Fairy-Stories", where you "think you are bodily inside its Secondary World". Shippey says of the same passage that "Frodo indeed finds himself listening in highly Keatsian style". Shippey adds that the poem offers Wordsworthian "romantic glimpses of 'old unhappy far-off things'", as well as echoes of Keats's lines: 

with Shippey's emphasis on Keats's alliteration and assonance, similar to some of the devices used by Tolkien in his poem.

Contrasting poems

Paul H. Kocher writes that "Errantry" and the "Song of Eärendil" are "obviously designed for contrast", as if Tolkien had set himself the challenge of using the same theme of endless wandering, the same metrical forms and the same rhyming schemes, to see if it would be possible to create both a tragedy and an "airy jest": "Looking at the passages picturing the armour of the two heroes we can see both the similarity in structure and the polarity in tone".

Success and failure

Verlyn Flieger picks up a question Shippey asked while discussing the poem, namely, what is the relationship of success and failure in the story. Shippey noted that on the one hand, Eärendil's Silmaril was called "The Flammifer of Westernesse", the victory-emblem of Númenor; but that on the other hand, it was linked "with loss and homelessness, with the weeping of women". Flieger writes that both in the poem and in The Silmarillion, light is a positive symbol of the creation, but the Silmarils have a powerful negative impact.

Settings

The song was recorded by The Tolkien Ensemble on their 2005 CD Leaving Rivendell. The composer Stephen Eddins considers Hall's setting of the song to be the most successful in the album. It is played on guitar by Peter Hall and sung by the Scottish musician Nick Keir, and to Eddins it "sounds authentically rooted in Celtic folk music, with occasional eccentric and unexpected but effective harmonizations". He admired the singing and playing of The Tolkien Ensemble, the Danish Radio Sinfonietta, and the Danish National Chamber Choir on the album; the conductor was Morten Ryelund Sørensen. Adele McAllister has recorded her own setting of the song.

Notes

References

Primary

Secondary

Sources 

 
 
 

Poems in The Lord of the Rings